Nguyễn Công Thành (born 5 October 1997) is a Vietnamese footballer who plays as a forward for V.League 2 club , on loan from Đồng Tháp.

References 

1997 births
Living people
Vietnamese footballers
Association football forwards
V.League 1 players
People from Đồng Tháp Province
Dong Thap FC players